Cultural genocide or cultural cleansing is a concept which was proposed by lawyer Raphael Lemkin in 1944 as a component of genocide. Though the precise definition of cultural genocide remains contested, the Armenian genocide Museum defines it as "acts and measures undertaken to destroy nations' or ethnic groups' culture through spiritual, national, and cultural destruction."

Some ethnologists, such as Robert Jaulin, use the term ethnocide as a substitute for cultural genocide, although this usage has been criticized as risking the confusion between ethnicity and culture. Juxtaposed next to ethnocide, cultural genocide was considered in the 2007 United Nations Declaration on the Rights of Indigenous Peoples; however, it was removed in the final document and simply replaced with "genocide".

Definition 
The legal definition of genocide is unspecific about the exact way in which genocide is committed, only stating that it is destruction with the intent to destroy a racial, religious, ethnic or national group.

Among many other potential reasons, cultural genocide may be committed for religious motives (e.g., iconoclasm); as part of a campaign of ethnic cleansing to remove the evidence of a people from a specific locale or history; as part of an effort to implement a Year zero, in which the past and its associated culture is deleted and history is "reset".

Binding international law

Cultural property

Cultural genocide involves the eradication and destruction of cultural artifacts, such as books, artworks, and structures. 
Such practices are forbidden during an armed conflict under the Hague Convention of 1907 Respecting the Laws and Customs of War on Land, which states in Article 25 that "the attack or bombardment, by whatever means, of towns, villages, dwellings, or buildings which are undefended is prohibited"; in Article 27 that "in sieges and bombardments all necessary steps must be taken to spare, as far as possible, buildings dedicated to religion, art, science, or charitable purposes, historic monuments, hospitals, and places where the sick and wounded are collected, provided they are not being used at the time for military purposes"; and in Article 28 that "the pillage of a town or place, even when taken by assault, is prohibited."
In the Americas, the Roerich Pact became the first international treaty substantially expanding and entirely dedicated to protection of cultural property; its Article 1 states: "The historic monuments, museums, scientific, artistic, educational and cultural institutions shall be considered as neutral and as such respected and protected by belligerents. The same respect and protection shall be due to the personnel of the institutions mentioned above. The same respect and protection shall be accorded to the historic monuments, museums, scientific, artistic, educational and cultural institutions in time of peace as well as in war."
Following the experiences of World War II and the success of the regional Roerich Pact, a new global treaty, the Hague Convention for the Protection of Cultural Property in the Event of Armed Conflict, was adopted, followed by its two supplentary protocols. Under the Second Protocol to the latter convention, it is obligatory for the contracting parties to penalise the perpetrators of such acts. 
In addition, the World Heritage Sites are also at any time protected by the World Heritage Convention, which states in Article 4: "Each State Party to this Convention recognizes that the duty of ensuring the identification, protection, conservation, presentation and transmission to future generations of the cultural and natural heritage referred to in Articles 1 and 2 and situated on its territory, belongs primarily to that State. It will do all it can to this end, to the utmost of its own resources and, where appropriate, with any international assistance and co-operation, in particular, financial, artistic, scientific and technical, which it may be able to obtain", while under Article 6 (3), "Each State Party to this Convention undertakes not to take any deliberate measures which might damage directly or indirectly the cultural and natural heritage referred to in Articles 1 and 2 situated on the territory of other States Parties to this Convention."
The basic rules were reinforced by the two 1977 protocols to the 1949 Geneva Convention
Article 53 of the Protocol Additional to the Geneva Conventions of 12 August 1949, and relating to the Protection of Victims of International Armed Conflicts (Protocol I), 8 June 1977, states: "Without prejudice to the provisions of the Hague Convention for the Protection of Cultural Property in the Event of Armed Conflict of 14 May 1954, and of other relevant international instruments, it is prohibited: to commit any acts of hostility directed against the historic monuments, works of art or places of worship which constitute the cultural or spiritual heritage of peoples; to use such objects in support of the military effort; to make such objects the object of reprisals."
Article 16 of the Protocol Additional to the Geneva Conventions of 12 August 1949, and relating to the Protection of Victims of Non-International Armed Conflicts (Protocol II), 8 June 1977, states: "Without prejudice to the provisions of the Hague Convention for the Protection of Cultural Property in the Event of Armed Conflict of 14 May 1954, it is prohibited to commit any acts of hostility directed against historic monuments, works of art or places of worship which constitute the cultural or spiritual heritage of peoples, and to use them in support of the military effort."
If the perpetrators are not penalised due to failure or unwillingness of a state to prosecute them, they may be brought to justice under the Rome Statute, adopted in July 1998 and entering into force four years later, the legal basis of the International Criminal Court (ICC), which defines in Article 8(2) the following cultural property-related war crimes in both international and non-international armed conflicts: "Intentionally launching an attack in the knowledge that such attack will cause incidental loss of life or injury to civilians or damage to civilian objects or widespread, long-term and severe damage to the natural environment which would be clearly excessive in relation to the concrete and direct overall military advantage anticipated (international conflicts only); Extensive destruction and appropriation of property, not justified by military necessity and carried out unlawfully and wantonly; Destroying or seizing the enemy’s/adversary’s property unless such destruction or seizure be imperatively demanded by the necessities of war/conflict; Attacking or bombarding, by whatever means, towns, villages, dwellings or buildings which are undefended and which are not military objectives; Deliberate attacks against buildings of a religious, educational, artistic, scientific or non-profit nature and against historical monuments; Pillaging a town or place, even when taken by assault."

Intangible cultural heritage
Cultural genocide may also involve forced assimilation, as well as the suppression of a language or cultural activities that do not conform to the destroyer's notion of what is appropriate. 
Article 2 of the Genocide Convention defines the following intangible culture-related aspects of genocide: "Imposing measures intended to prevent births within the group; Forcibly transferring children of the group to another group";
Article 27 of the International Covenant on Civil and Political Rights mandates the rights of ethnic, religious and linguistic minority to enjoy their own culture, to profess their own religion, and to use their own language. 
Article 15 of the International Covenant on Economic, Social and Cultural Rights assures minority groups the right to practice and preserve their languages, religions, art forms, and ways of life.
The International Convention on the Suppression and Punishment of the Crime of Apartheid lists, among others: "any legislative measures and other measures calculated to prevent a racial group or groups from participation in the political, social, economic and cultural life of the country and the deliberate creation of conditions preventing the full development of such a group or groups, in particular bу denying to members of a racial group or groups basic human rights and freedoms, including the right to work, the right to form recognized trade unions, the right to education, the right to leave and to return to their country, the right to a nationality, the right to freedom of movement and residence, the right to freedom of opinion and expression, and the right to freedom of peaceful assembly and association; any measures, including legislative measures, designed to divide the population along racial lines by the creation of separate reserves and ghettos for the members of a racial group or groups, the prohibition of mixed marriages among members of various racial groups, the expropriation of landed property belonging to a racial group or groups or to members thereof" – as a manifestation of the crime of apartheid and requires the States Parties to prosecute perpetors of such practices. If it is not the case due to failure or unwillingness of a state to prosecute them, they may be brought to justice under the Rome Statute (see below)
Some of the abovementioned oppressive or repressive practices are illegal also under the Convention on the Rights of the Child, in particular its Article 20(3) concerning the choice of foster placement: "When considering solutions, due regard shall be paid to the desirability of continuity in a child's upbringing and to the child's ethnic, religious, cultural and linguistic background", as well as Article 30, which states that "In those States in which ethnic, religious or linguistic minorities or persons of indigenous origin exist, a child belonging to such a minority or who is indigenous shall not be denied the right, in community with other members of his or her group, to enjoy his or her own culture, to profess and practise his or her own religion, or to use his or her own language."
The Rome Statute
Article 6 defines the following intangible culture-related aspects of genocide: "Imposing measures intended to prevent births within the group; Forcibly transferring children of the group to another group";
Article 7 (1) defines the following intangible culture-related crimes against humanity: "Enslavement; Deportation or forcible transfer of population; Rape, sexual slavery, enforced prostitution, forced pregnancy, enforced sterilization, or any other form of sexual violence of comparable gravity; Persecution against any identifiable group or collectivity on political, racial, national, ethnic, cultural, religious, gender as defined in paragraph 3, or other grounds that are universally recognized as impermissible under international law, in connection with any act referred to in this paragraph or any crime within the jurisdiction of the Court; The crime of apartheid.";
Article 8 (2) defines the following intangible culture-related war crimes: "Committing outrages upon personal dignity, in particular humiliating and degrading treatment; Committing rape, sexual slavery, enforced prostitution, forced pregnancy, as defined in article 7, paragraph 2 (f), enforced sterilization, or any other form of sexual violence also constituting a grave breach of the Geneva Convention; Unlawful deportation or transfer or unlawful confinement; The transfer, directly or indirectly, by the Occupying Power of parts of its own civilian population into the territory it occupies, or the deportation or transfer of all or parts of the population of the occupied territory within or outside fthis territory; Ordering the displacement of the civilian population for reasons related to the conflict, unless the security of the civilians involved or imperative military reasons so demand."
Under Article 11 of the Convention for the Safeguarding of the Intangible Cultural Heritage, "each State Party shall take the necessary measures to ensure the safeguarding of the intangible cultural heritage present in its territory", while under Article 19 (2), "Without prejudice to the provisions of their national legislation and customary law and practices, the States Parties recognize that the safeguarding of intangible cultural heritage is of general interest to humanity, and to that end undertake to cooperate at the bilateral, subregional, regional and international levels."
In Europe, the European Convention on Human Rights (Council of Europe members, including all European sovereign countries, except for Belarus, Kazakhstan and the Vatican City) and the Framework Convention for the Protection of National Minorities (all European sovereign countries, except for Belarus, Belgium, Greece, France, Iceland, Kazakhstan, Turkey and the Vatican City) greatly expand the protection against such activities, as well as provide the necessary legal means (tools) to safeguard and exercise these rights in practice, in particular an application to the European Court of Human Rights
in the European Union, additional protection of the cultural, religious and linguistic diversity is granted by the Charter of Fundamental Rights of the European Union, in particular by its titles II (Freedoms) and III (Equality); it may be enforced in practice through an application to the Court of Justice of the European Union

History

Etymology 
The notion of 'cultural genocide' has been acknowledged as early as 1944, when lawyer Raphael Lemkin distinguished a cultural component of genocide. The term itself would not emerge until later. In 1989, Robert Badinter, a French criminal lawyer known for his stance against the death penalty, used the term "cultural genocide" on a television show to describe what he said was the disappearance of Tibetan culture in the presence of the 14th Dalai Lama. The Dalai Lama would later use the term in 1993 and he would use it again in 2008.

Proposed inclusion in the UN's DRIP

Those who drafted the 1948 Genocide Convention initially considered using of the term, but later dropped it from inclusion.

Article 7 of a 1994 draft of the United Nations Declaration on the Rights of Indigenous Peoples (DRIP) uses the phrase "cultural genocide" but does not define what it means. The complete article in the draft read as follows:
Indigenous peoples have the collective and individual right not to be subjected to ethnocide and cultural genocide, including prevention of and redress for:
(a) Any action which has the aim or effect of depriving them of their integrity as distinct peoples, or of their cultural values or ethnic identities;
(b) Any action which has the aim or effect of dispossessing them of their lands, territories or resources;
(c) Any form of population transfer which has the aim or effect of violating or undermining any of their rights;
(d) Any form of assimilation or integration by other cultures or ways of life imposed on them by legislative, administrative or other measures;
(e) Any form of propaganda directed against them.

This wording only ever appeared in a draft. The DRIP—which was adopted by the United Nations General Assembly during its 62nd session at UN Headquarters in New York City on 13 September 2007—only makes reference to genocide once, when it mentions "genocide, or any other act of violence" in Article 7. Though the concept of "ethnocide" and "cultural genocide" was removed in the version adopted by the General Assembly, the sub-points from the draft noted above were retained (with slightly expanded wording) in Article 8 that speaks to "the right not to be subject to forced assimilation."

List of cultural genocides 
The term has been used to describe the destruction of cultural heritage in connection with various events listed mainly from the 20th century:

Europe
 Historian Stephen Wheatcroft states that Soviet peasantry were subject to cultural destruction in the creation of the "New Soviet man".
 In reference to the Axis powers (primarily, Nazi Germany)'s policies towards some nations during World War II (ex. the German occupation of Poland & the destruction of Polish culture).
 In the Bosnian War during the Siege of Sarajevo, cultural genocide was committed by Bosnian Serb forces. The National and University Library of Bosnia and Herzegovina was specifically targeted and besieged by cannons positioned all around the city. The National Library was completely destroyed in the fire, along with 80 percent of its contents. Some 3 million books were destroyed, along with hundreds of original documents from the Ottoman Empire and the Austro-Hungarian monarchy.
 2004 unrest in Kosovo. In an urgent appeal, issued on 18 March by the extraordinary session of the Expanded Convocation of the Holy Synod of Serbian Orthodox Church, it was reported that a number of Serbian churches and shrines in Kosovo had been damaged or destroyed by Albanian rioters. At least 30 sites were completely destroyed, more or less destroyed, or further destroyed (sites that had been previously damaged).
After the Greek Civil War, Greek authorities had conducted a cultural genocide upon Slavic Macedonians in Northern Greece through prohibition of communication in Slavic languages, renaming of cities, towns and villages (Lerin/Лерин to Florina etc.), deportation of Slavic Macedonians, particularly women and children, as well as many other actions intended to marginalize and oppress the Slavic Macedonians residing in Northern Greece. While some of these actions had been motivated by political ideology, as many of the Slavic Macedonians had sided with the defeated communists, the majority of actions were committed to wipe out any traces of Slavic Macedonians or their culture in Northern Greece.
Turkey: Especially in the island of Imbros. The island was primarily inhabited by ethnic Greeks from antiquity until approximately the 1960s, when many were forced to flee due to a campaign of cultural genocide and discrimination enacted by the Turkish government. Massive scale persecution against the local Greeks started in 1961, as part of the Eritme Programmi operation that aimed at the elimination of Greek education and the enforcement of economic, psychological pressure and violence. Under these conditions, the Turkish government approved the appropriation of >90% of the cultivated areas of the island and the settlement of additional 6,000 ethnic Turks from mainland Turkey. Finally, the island was also officially renamed by Turkey in 1970 to Gökçeada to finalize the removal of any remaining Greek influence. 
Francoist Spain: the alleged prohibition of the use of minority languages such as Catalan in the public space, from schools to shops, public transport, or even in the streets, the banning of the use of Catalan birth names for children, the persecution and destruction of books in Catalan language, renaming of cities, streets and all toponyms from Catalan to Spanish, and the abolition of government and all cultural institutions in Catalonia, with the goal of total cultural suppression and assimilation. 
 John D. Hargreaves writes that "A policy of cultural genocide was implemented: the Catalan language and key symbols of Catalan independent identity and nationhood, such as the flag (the senyera), the national hymn ('Els Segadors') and the national dance (the sardana), were proscribed. Any sign of independence or opposition, in fact, was brutally suppressed. Catalan identity and consequently the Catalan nation were threatened with extinction." 
 Although Josep Pla and other Catalan authors published books in Catalan in the 1950s, and even there were prizes of Catalan Literature during Francoism like the Premi Sant Jordi de novel·la, editorial production in Catalan never recovered the peak levels it had reached before Spanish Civil War . A prominent case of popularization of Catalan was Joan Manuel Serrat: although he could compose Catalan songs and gained certain notoriety, he was not allowed to sing in Catalan in the Eurovision contest its La, la, la. theme, and was replaced by Spanish singer Massiel, who won the Eurovision contest . Overall, despite some tolerance as Franco's regime relaxed in the late 60s and early 70s, Catalan and the rest of minority languages of Spain were strictly banned from higher education, administration and all official endeavors, thus being in practice confined to the private sphere and domestic uses (see Language policies of Francoist Spain).
Ireland has been described as enduring cultural genocide under British rule, which aimed to eradicate the Irish language, Irish culture, and the Catholic faith. Ireland's cultural genocide is discussed in the Dictionary of Genocide (2007), as well as by Christopher Murray (1997) in reference to the suppression of the Irish language; Hilary M. Carey (1997) in reference to the transportation of Irish convicts to Australia; and by Tomás Mac Síomóin (2018).
France's policies (also known as Vergonha in Occitan) towards its various regional and minority languages, referring to non-standard French as patois, have been described as genocide by professor of Catalan philology at the University of the Balearic Islands Jaume Corbera i Pou who argues,
When at the mid-19th century, primary school is made compulsory all across the State, it is also made clear that only French will be taught, and the teachers will severely punish any pupil speaking in patois. The aim of the French educational system will consequently not be to dignify the pupils' natural humanity, developing their culture and teaching them to write their language, but rather to humiliate them and morally degrade them for the simple fact of being what tradition and their nature made them. The self-proclaimed country of the "human rights" will then ignore one of man's most fundamental rights, the right to be himself and speak the language of his nation. And with that attitude France, the "grande France" that calls itself the champion of liberty, will pass the 20th century, indifferent to the timid protest movements of the various linguistic communities it submitted and the literary prestige they may have given birth to.

[...]

France, that under Franco's reign was seen here [in Catalonia] as the safe haven of freedom, has the miserable honour of being the [only] State of Europe—and probably the world – that succeeded best in the diabolical task of destroying its own ethnic and linguistic patrimony and moreover, of destroying human family bonds: many parents and children, or grandparents and grandchildren, have different languages, and the latter feel ashamed of the first because they speak a despicable patois, and no element of the grandparents' culture has been transmitted to the younger generation, as if they were born out of a completely new world. This is the French State that has just entered the 21st century, a country where stone monuments and natural landscapes are preserved and respected, but where many centuries of popular creation expressed in different tongues are on the brink of extinction. The "gloire" and the "grandeur" built on a genocide. No liberty, no equality, no fraternity: just cultural extermination, this is the real motto of the French Republic.

Asia
 The persecution of Baháʼís in Iran as a case of religious persecution has been called a cultural genocide.
 The destruction by Azerbaijan of thousands of medieval Armenian Churches, khachkars and gravestones at a cemetery in Julfa, and Azerbaijan's subsequent denial that the site had ever existed, has been cited as an example of cultural genocide.
 Historian Sarah Cameron believes that while the Kazakh famine of 1931–1933 combined with a campaign against nomads was not genocide in the sense of the Genocide Convention definition, it complies with Raphael Lemkin's original concept of genocide, which considered destruction of culture to be as genocidal as physical annihilation.
 Japanese occupation of Korea. Japan's extensive policy of cultural genocide included forcibly changing Korean names into Japanese, exclusive use of Japanese language, school instruction in the Japanese "ethical system", and Shinto worship.
 The Sinicization of Tibet from the 1950s onwards. 
 The Japanese ban and discrimination of the Ainu and Ryukyuan as well as other regional cultures.
 The "Destruction of the Four Olds" in the People's Republic of China, in which Red Guards destroyed various religious, cultural, and historical sites throughout the country, especially in Beijing and at the Temple of Confucius in Shandong.
The persecution of Sri Lankan Tamils during the Sri Lankan Civil War as a case of ethnic cleansing, which was sponsored by the government and continuous till date by Sinhalaisation of northern and eastern parts of the island.
The destruction of Armenian cultural heritage in Turkey during, and in the decades after, the Armenian genocide.
The Islamic State of Iraq and the Levant's forced conversions in its territory and destroyed ancient Assyrian, Roman, Yazidi and Christian heritage sites and museums.
The Uyghur genocide in the PRC. Some one million members of China's Muslim Uyghur minority have been detained in mass detention camps, termed "reeducation camps", which are aimed at changing the political thinking of detainees, their identities, and their religious beliefs under the guise of "anti-terrorism". Satellite evidence suggests that China has also razed more than two dozen Uyghur Muslim religious sites to the ground.

Oceania
 The Stolen Generations in Australia where half-caste children were removed from their families.

North America

Indigenous peoples in the United States. 
In the mid-1800s to early 1900s, the United States established American Indian boarding schools to assimilate Native American children and youth into Euro-American culture.
Indigenous peoples in Canada. 
In 2007, a Canadian Member of Parliament criticized the Ministry of Indian Affairs' destruction of documents that were evidence to the "cultural genocide" imposed on Indigenous peoples within Canada.
The Indian Residential Schools Truth and Reconciliation Commission of Canada concluded that the Canadian Indian residential school system "can best be described as 'cultural genocide.
In 2015, Chief Justice Beverly McLachlin, of the Supreme Court of Canada, stated in a speech to the Global Centre for Pluralism that Canada's historical treatment of Indigenous peoples was an attempt at cultural genocide, and "the worst stain on Canada's human-rights record."

See also

 American Indian boarding schools
 Canadian Indian residential school system
 Cultural conflict
 Cultural imperialism
 Culture war
 Ethnic cleansing
 Ethnocide
 Forced assimilation
 Institutional racism
 Language death
 Linguistic discrimination (includes Linguicide)
 List of destroyed heritage
 Native schools in New Zealand
 Policide
 Religious cleansing
 Stolen Generations (Australia)
 Uyghur genocide

References

Further reading
 Bibliography of Genocide studies

External links 
 From Paris to Cairo: Resistance of the Unacculturated on identity and the nation state.
 Chronology of the repression of the Catalan language in catalan language

 
1940s neologisms
Genocide
Human rights by issue
Majority–minority relations

pt:Genocídio cultural